Arena are an English neo-progressive rock band founded in 1995. Their style ranges from symphonic to hard rock.

History 
Arena was founded in 1995 by Clive Nolan keyboardist of Pendragon and Shadowland, and Mick Pointer, the original drummer of Marillion, his tenure lasting from 1979 until 1983. The other founding members of the band were guitarist Keith More, vocalist John Carson, and bassist Cliff Orsi. Orsi was replaced by John Jowitt (of IQ) in the band's inaugural year, whilst Carson and More left the band in 1996 and 1997, and were replaced by Paul Wrightson and John Mitchell (of Frost*) respectively.

Both Jowitt and Wrightson left the band in 1998, to be replaced by Ian Salmon and Rob Sowden, creating the band's most stable lineup to date (from 1998 until 2010). This lineup came to an end with Paul Manzi replacing Sowden in 2010. In 2011, Jowitt rejoined the band to replace the departing Salmon, leaving again in 2014 and being replaced by Kylan Amos. In July 2020, Manzi was replaced by Damian Wilson.

Most of the band's lyrics are written by Nolan, though Pointer contributed lyrics to Sirens and other tracks on the first two albums.

Musically the band's style ranges from symphonic to hard rock. While in the beginning the Band sound like the "old" Marillion from the Fish era, some of the band's recent albums have a similar sound to Nolan's earlier band, Shadowland.

AllMusic called them one of the dominant neo-prog groups of the 1990s.

Personnel

Members 

Current members
 Clive Nolan – keyboards, backing vocals (1995–present)
 Mick Pointer – drums (1995–present)
 John Mitchell – guitars, backing vocals (1997–present)
 Kylan Amos – bass (2014–present)
 Damian Wilson – lead vocals (2020–present)

Former members
 Keith More – guitars, backing vocals (1995–1997)
 John Carson – lead vocals (1995–1996)
 Cliff Orsi – bass (1995)
 John Jowitt – bass, backing vocals (1995–1998, 2011–2014)
 Paul Wrightson – lead vocals (1996–1998)
 Ian Salmon – bass (1998–2011)
 Rob Sowden – lead vocals (1998–2010)
 Paul Manzi – lead vocals (2010–2020)

Lineups

Timeline

Discography

Studio 
 Songs from the Lion's Cage (1995)
 Pride (1996)
 The Visitor (1998)
 Immortal? (2000)
 Contagion (2003)
 Pepper's Ghost (2005)
 The Seventh Degree of Separation (2011)
 The Unquiet Sky (2015)
 Double Vision (2018)
 The Theory of Molecular Inheritance (2022)

Live 
 Welcome to the Stage (1997)
 Breakfast in Biarritz (2001)
 Live & Life (2004)
 Arena: Live (2013)
 Arena: XX (2016)

EP 
 Edits (1996)
 The Cry (1997)
 Contagious (2003)
 Contagium (2003)

Compilations 
 Ten Years On (2006)

Videos/DVDs 
 Caught in the Act (2003) (live)
 Smoke & Mirrors (2006) (live)
 Rapture (2011) (live)
 Arena: XX (2016) (live)
 Re-Visited (2018) (live)

Fanclub releases 
 Welcome Back! To the Stage (1997)
 The Visitor Revisited (1999)
 Unlocking the Cage (2000)
 Radiance (2003)

References

External links 

Official site
The Shattered Room Official Arena Forum
Interview with Clive Nolan for "TSDoS"

English progressive rock groups
Musical groups established in 1995
Articles which contain graphical timelines
Metal Mind Productions artists